Aurantimicrobium is a Gram-positive, aerobic and non-motile genus of bacteria from the family of Microbacteriaceae. Aurantimicrobium minutum has been isolated from water of a river in Japan.

References

Microbacteriaceae
Bacteria genera